Flat Holm Lighthouse is  high and  above mean high water. It has a 100 watt lamp that flashes three times every ten seconds, and is red from 106° to 140°; white to 151°; red to 203°; white to 106°.

History

18th century
The first light on the island was a simple brazier mounted on a wooden frame, which stood on the high eastern part of the island. In 1733 the Society of Merchant Venturers of Bristol found the brazier to be unreliable and petitioned the general lighthouse authority, Trinity House, for an actual lighthouse, but the petition failed.  In 1735 Mr. William Crispe of Bristol submitted a proposal to build a lighthouse at his own expense. This initial proposal also failed but negotiations resumed in 1736 when 60 soldiers drowned after their vessel crashed on the Wolves rocks near Flat Holm. Following this disaster, the Society of Merchant Venturers finally supported William Crispe's proposal. Crispe agreed to pay £800 (£129,360, $188,865 in 2008) for the construction of the tower as well as the fees permits. The construction of the tower finished in 1737 and it began operating on 25 March 1738.

The lighthouse was struck by lightning in a severe storm on 22 December 1790. The keeper narrowly escaped but the top of the tower was severely damaged.

19th century
Flat Holm Lighthouse was the last signal station in the country in private ownership. In July 1822, Trinity House finally bought the lease for £15,838.10 (£1.51 million, $2.2 million in 2008). Two years later a fountain oil lamp was installed and the lantern was raised by another . In 1867 a lantern  in diameter was installed. A clockwork mechanism to rotate the light was installed in 1881.

20th century
The lighthouse was renovated in 1929 to include accommodations for up to four keepers. This lasted until 1988, when the lighthouse became fully automated and the keepers were withdrawn. In 1997, the light was modernised and converted to solar power. It is now monitored and controlled by the Trinity House Operations Control Centre at Harwich, in Essex.

Foghorn

Built by Trinity House in 1906, the foghorn building is a Grade II listed building. The siren was originally powered by an  engine, which gave two blasts in quick succession at two-minute intervals that could be clearly heard by people living on both coasts but for many years following World War II, the foghorn was heard as one long and one short blast and nautical almanac data as at 1965, stated that the interval was 1.5 minutes. Volunteers from the Flat Holm Society, with help from the Prince's Trust, restored the horn and engines in the 1960s. The Foghorn Station was officially reopened by the Welsh Secretary and the Welsh Assembly First Secretary in May 2000 when the foghorn was sounded for the first time since 1988.

References

Coast of Cardiff
Lighthouses in Wales